Jasper Collins (born November 28, 1991) is a Canadian football wide receiver. He played college football for Mount Union. He was signed by the Miami Dolphins as an undrafted free agent hours after the 2013 NFL Draft. After being let go, he became a member of the Cleveland Browns, Dolphins, and Pittsburgh Steelers practice squads before being signed by the Bengals in 2014.

High school
Collins attended Geneva High School in Geneva, New York. He was a four-year letterwinner who was an all-state, all-conference, and all-area selection multiple times during his career.

College career
Collins attended Mount Union from 2009–2012. During his tenure, he played with former purple raiders wide receiver Cecil Shorts III, and played for the same school as Pierre Garçon. As a freshman, he played in 11 games and had seven catches for 81 yards, and had two punt returns 105 yards including an 89-yard return for a touchdown against Marietta, which is the longest punt return touchdown in Mount Union history. The following season, he played in 15 games and has 66 catches for 908 yards and two touchdowns and was a conference honorable mention. As a junior, he played in 11 games and led team with 67 catches for 844 yards with 13 touchdowns, and had four 100-yard receiving games and earned first-team all-conference accolades. In his last season, he played in 15 games and led the Ohio Athletic Conference in yards per game (112.9), receptions (92), receiving yards (1,694) and receiving touchdowns (22). And was once again earned first-team all-conference honors.

Professional career

NFL Draft
Jasper Collins was not selected in the 2013 NFL Draft.

Miami Dolphins
On April 27, 2013, Jasper Collins signed as an undrafted free agent with the Miami Dolphins. On July 31, 2013, Collins was waived/injured by the Miami Dolphins. Collins cleared waivers and was placed on injured reserve. On August 3, 2013, he was released with an injury settlement.

Cleveland Browns
On September 2, 2013, the Cleveland Browns signed Collins to their practice squad.

References

External links
Mount Union Purple Raiders bio
Miami Dolphins bio

1991 births
Living people
American football wide receivers
Canadian football wide receivers
American players of Canadian football
Mount Union Purple Raiders football players
People from Geneva, New York
Miami Dolphins players
Cleveland Browns players
Pittsburgh Steelers players
Cincinnati Bengals players
Boston Brawlers players
Hamilton Tiger-Cats players
Players of American football from New York (state)